Heinrich Angst (August 29, 1915 – September 9, 1989) was a Swiss bobsledder who competed in the mid-1950s. Competing in two Winter Olympics, he won a gold medal in the four-man event at the Cortina d'Ampezzo in 1956.

Angst also won seven medals at the FIBT World Championships with two golds (Four-man: 1954, 1955), one silver (Two-man: 1949) and four bronzes (Two-man: 1955, Four-man: 1949, 1950, 1951).

References
Bobsleigh four-man Olympic medalists for 1924, 1932-56, and since 1964
Bobsleigh two-man world championship medalists since 1931
Bobsleigh four-man world championship medalists since 1930
Wallechinsky, David (1984). "Bobsled". In The Complete Book of the Olympics: 1896-1980. New York: Penguin Books. pp. 558, 560–1.

1915 births
1989 deaths
Bobsledders at the 1948 Winter Olympics
Bobsledders at the 1956 Winter Olympics
Olympic bobsledders of Switzerland
Olympic gold medalists for Switzerland
Swiss male bobsledders
Olympic medalists in bobsleigh
Medalists at the 1956 Winter Olympics
20th-century Swiss people